The Holkars (Pronunciation: [ɦo(ː)ɭkəɾ]) were a dynasty of Maratha Confederacy of India. The Holkars were generals under Peshwa Baji Rao I, and later became Maharajas of Indore in Central India as an independent member of the Maratha Empire until 1818. Later, their kingdom became a princely state under the protectorate of British India.

The dynasty was founded with Malhar Rao, who joined the service of the Peshwas of the Maratha Empire in 1721, and quickly rose to the rank of Subedar. The name of the dynasty was associated with the title of the ruler, who was known informally as Holkar Maharaja.

Establishment of Holkar rule 

The Holkars were of Dhangar origin.

Malhar Rao Holkar (1694–1766), a Maratha chief serving Peshwa Baji Rao, established the dynasty's rule over Indore. In the 1720s, he led Maratha armies in Malwa region, and in 1733 was granted 9 parghanas in the vicinity of Indore by the Peshwa. The township of Indore had already existed as an independent principality established by Nandlal Mandloi of Kampel,  Nandlal Mandloi was won by the Maratha force and allowed them to camp across the Khan  River. In 1734, Malhar Rao established a camp later called Malharganj. In 1747, he started the construction of his royal palace, the Rajwada. By the time of his death, he ruled much of Malwa, and was acknowledged as one of the five virtually independent rulers of the Maratha Confederacy.

He was succeeded by Ahilyabai Holkar (r. 1767–1795), his daughter-in-law. She was born in the Chaundi village in Maharashtra. She moved the capital to Maheshwar, south of Indore on the Narmada River. Rani Ahilyabai was a prolific builder and patron of Hindu temples in Maheshwar and Indore. She also built temples at sacred sites outside her kingdom, from Dwarka in Gujarat east to the Kashi Vishwanath Temple at Varanasi on the Ganges.

The adopted son of Malhar Rao Holkar, Tukoji Rao Holkar (r. 1795–1797) briefly succeeded Rani Ahilyabai upon her death. Tukoji Rao had been a commander under Ahilyabai for her entire rule.

Extending the Holkar dominion

His son Yashwantrao Holkar (r. 1797–1811) (also called as Jaswant Rao) succeeded him upon his death. He tried to free the Delhi Mughal Emperor Shah Alam II from the British in the unsuccessful Second Anglo-Maratha War. The grateful Shah Alam gave him the title of Maharajadiraj Rajrajeshwar Alija Bahadur in honor of his bravery.

Attempts by Yashwantrao Holkar to unite the kings failed, and he was approached to sign a peace treaty with the British. The Treaty of Rajghat, signed late December 1805, recognised him as a sovereign king.

Battle of Mahidpur

In 1811, the four-year-old Malhar Rao Holkar III succeeded Yashwantrao Holkar. His mother, Tulsabai Holkar, looked after the administration. However, with the help of Pathans, Pindaris, and the British, Dharama Kunwar and Balaram Seth plotted to imprison Tulsabai and Malharrao. When Tulsabai learnt about this, she beheaded both of them in 1815 and appointed Tantia Jog. As a result, Gaffur Khan Pindari secretly signed a treaty with the British on 9 November 1817 and killed Tulsabai on 19 December 1817.

The treaty was signed on 6 January 1818 at Mandsaur. Bhimabai Holkar did not accept the treaty, and kept attacking the British by guerilla methods. Years later, in revolt of 1857, Rani Lakshmibai of Jhansi took inspiration from Bhimabai Holkar and also fought against the British. At the conclusion of the Third Anglo-Maratha War, the Holkars lost much of their territory to the British and were incorporated into the British Raj as a princely state of the Central India Agency. The capital was shifted from Bhanpura to Indore.

Princely state

Malharrao Holkar III entered Indore on 2 November 1818. Tantia Jog was appointed his Diwan as he was a minor. As the old palace had been destroyed by the army of Daulat Rao Scindia, a new palace was constructed in its place. Malharrao III was succeeded by Marthand Rao Holkar, who formally ascended to the throne on 17 January 1834. He was replaced by Hari Rao Holkar, nephew of Yashwantrao, who ascended to the throne on 17 April 1834. He adopted Khande Rao Holkar II on 2 July 1841 and died on 24 October 1843. Khanderao was formally installed as the ruler on 13 November 1843, but he suddenly died on 17 February 1844. Tukojirao Holkar II (1835–1886) was installed on the throne on 27 June 1844. During the Indian Rebellion of 1857, he was loyal to the British East India Company. In October 1872, he appointed T. Madhava Rao as the Diwan of Indore. He died on 17 June 1886 and was succeeded by his eldest son, Shivajirao Holkar.

Yashwantrao Holkar II (reigned 1926–1948) ruled Indore state until shortly after India's independence in 1947, when he acceded to the Union of India. Indore became a district of Madhya Bharat state, which was merged into Madhya Pradesh state in 1956.

Holkar Maharajas of Indore
 Malhar Rao Holkar I (r. 2 November 1731 – 20 May 1766). Born 16 March 1693, died 20 May 1766
 Male Rao Holkar (r. 23 August 1766 – 5 April 1767). Born 1745, died 5 April 1767
 Ahilya Bai Holkar (first as a regent on 26 May 1766) (r. 27 March 1767 – 13 August 1795). Born 1725, died 13 August 1795
 Tukoji Rao Holkar I (r. 13 August 1795 – 29 January 1797). Born 1723, died 15 August 1797
 Kashi Rao Holkar (r. 29 January 1797 – January 1799) Born before 1776, died 1808
 Khande Rao Holkar (r. January 1799 – 22 February 1807) Born in 1798, died 1807
 Yashwant Rao Holkar I (first as a regent from 1799) (r. 1807 – 27 October 1811). Born 1776, died 27 October 1811
 Malhar Rao Holkar III (r. 27 October 1811 – 27 October 1833) Born 1806, died 27 October 1833
Marthand Rao Holkar (r. 17 January 1833 – 2 February 1834). Born 1830, died 2 June 1849
 Hari Rao Holkar (r. 17 April 1834 – 24 October 1843). Born 1795, died 24 October 1843
 Khande Rao Holkar II (r. 13 November 1843 – 17 February 1844). Born 1828, died 17 March 1844
 Tukoji Rao Holkar II (r. 27 June 1844 – 17 June 1886). Born 3 May 1835, died 17 June 1886
 Shivaji Rao Holkar (r. 17 June 1886 – 31 January 1903). Born 11 November 1859, died 13 October 1908
 Tukoji Rao Holkar III (r. 31 January 1903 – 26 February 1926). Born 26 November 1890, died 21 May 1978
 Yashwant Rao Holkar II (r. 26 February 1926 – 1948). Born 6 September 1908, died 5 December 1961

On 22 April 1948 the Maharaja of Indore signed a covenant with the rulers of the adjoining princely states to form a new state known as Madhya Bharat. Madhya Bharat was created on 28 May 1948. On 16 June 1948, the princely state of Indore, which the House of Holkar ruled, merged with the newly independent Indian states.

See also
 List of Maratha dynasties and states

Notes

References
Sethi, P.K., S.K. Bhatt and R. Holkar (1976). A Study of Holkar State Coinage, Indore: The Academy of Indian Numismatics and Sigillography.
Somerset Playne (compiler), R. V. Solomon, J. W. Bond, Arnold Wright (1922). Indian States: A Biographical, Historical, and Administrative Survey, London: Foreign and Colonial Compiling and Publishing Co., 1922 (also Asian Educational Services, 2006, 9788120619654, 835 pages

External links

 
WorldStatesmen- India

 
Dynasties of India
Maratha Empire
History of Malwa
History of Indore
Dhangar clans
Hindu dynasties